Roman Voynarovskyy (born 5 January 1980 in Russian SFSR) is a retired Ukrainian football midfielder.

External links
 Official Website Profile

1980 births
Living people
Russian emigrants to Ukraine
Ukrainian footballers
Ukraine student international footballers
Association football midfielders
FC Dynamo Saky players
FC Spartak Ivano-Frankivsk players
SC Tavriya Simferopol players
FC Krymteplytsia Molodizhne players
FC Kalush players
FC Tytan Armyansk players
FC Sevastopol players
FC Zirka Kropyvnytskyi players
FC Stal Alchevsk players
FC Desna Chernihiv players
FC Ihroservice Simferopol players
Russian football managers
Crimean Premier League managers